Yirrk-Thangalkl (Yir Thangedl) is a dialect of Yir-Yoront, a Paman language spoken on the southwestern part of the Cape York Peninsula, Queensland in Australia, by the Yirrk-Thangalkl people.
The language is also known as Yirr-Thangell and Yirrk-Mel.

During the early 1900s (decade), Yirrk-Thangalkl speakers started shifting to the Yir-Yoront dialect with the arrival of the Mitchell River Mission.

Phonology

Consonants 
Yirrk-Thangalkl has 16 consonants.

References 

Southwestern Paman languages
Extinct languages of Queensland